Marta Freitas is a member of the Assembly of the Republic of Portugal, being first elected in October 2019 as a representative of the Portuguese Socialist Party (PS) for the constituency of Madeira.

Education
Marta Luísa de Freitas was born on 27 September 1980. She has an undergraduate degree in physiotherapy and a master's in Physical Activity and Sport. She works as a physiotherapist at a retirement home and privately in Madeira.

Political career
In 2017, Freitas became a member of the Municipal Assembly in Funchal, capital of Portugal's Autonomous Region of Madeira. She was elected as a deputy of the National Assembly of Portugal in 2019. As a deputy, she is a member of the parliamentary commission on Labour and Social Security and the Working Group on the Rights of People with Disabilities. Freitas was re-elected for the Madeira constituency in the 2022 Portuguese legislative election on 30 January 2022.

References

1980 births
Living people
Socialist Party (Portugal) politicians
Members of the Assembly of the Republic (Portugal)
Women members of the Assembly of the Republic (Portugal)